Kiess is a lunar impact crater next to the southern border of the Mare Smythii, near the eastern limb of the Moon. It is located to the east of the crater Kästner, and to the north of Dale and Kreiken.

The interior floor of this crater has been flooded by lava, leaving only a narrow rim above the surface. This surface has a low albedo, and is as dark as the neighboring mare. There is a break in the northeastern rim of Kiess where the crater is nearly attached to the somewhat smaller Widmannstätten, another flooded formation. The overall shape of the rim is slightly elongated in longitude, but it is not overlaid by other craters of note. There are a low ridges on the western interior floor that are concentric to the inner wall.

See also 
 1788 Kiess, minor planet

References 

 LTO-81B4 Kiess, Lunar Topographic Orthophotomap (LTO) Series
 
 
 
 
 
 
 
 
 
 
 
 

Impact craters on the Moon